This timeline of time measurement inventions is a chronological list of particularly important or significant technological inventions relating to timekeeping devices and their inventors, where known.

Note: Dates for inventions are often controversial. Sometimes inventions are invented by several inventors around the same time, or may be invented in an impractical form many years before another inventor improves the invention into a more practical form. Where there is ambiguity, the date of the first known working version of the invention is used here.

Classical antiquity
  - Egyptian obelisks are among the earliest shadow clocks.
  - The oldest of all known sundials, dating back to the 19th Dynasty.
  - A shadow clock is developed similar in shape to a bent T-square.
 3rd century BC - Berossos invents the hemispherical sundial.
 270  - Ctesibius builds a water clock.

Medieval era
 11th century - Sets of hourglasses were maintained by ship's pages to mark the progress of a ship during its voyage
 11th century - Large town clocks were used in Europe to display local time, maintained by hand
 1335 - First known mechanical clock, in Milan
 1502 - Peter Henlein builds the first pocketwatch
 1522 - The Portuguese navigator Ferdinand Magellan used 18 hourglasses on each ship during his circumnavigation of the globe.

Modern era
 1656 - Christiaan Huygens builds the first accurate pendulum clock.
 1676 - Daniel Quare, a London clock-maker, invents the repeating clock, that chimes the number of hours (or even minutes).
 1680 - Second hand introduced
 1737 - John Harrison presents the first stable   marine chronometer, thereby allowing for precise longitude determination while at sea
 1850 - Aaron Lufkin Dennison starts in Roxbury, Mass.U.S.A. the Waltham Watch Company and develops the American System of Watch Manufacturing.
 1884 - International Meridian Conference adopts Greenwich Mean Time for consistency with Nevil Maskelyne's 18th century observations for the Method of Lunar Distances
 1893 - Introduction by Webb C. Ball  of the General Railroad Timepiece Standards in North America: Railroad chronometers
 1921 - The Shortt-Synchronome free pendulum clock becomes the first clock more accurate than the rotation of the Earth
 1927 - Joseph Horton and Warren Marrison describe the first quartz clock at Bell Telephone Laboratories.
 1946 - Felix Bloch and Edward Purcell develop nuclear magnetic resonance
 1949 - Harold Lyons develops an atomic clock based on the quantum mechanical vibrations of the ammonia molecule
 1983 - Radio-controlled clocks become common place in Europe
 1994 - Radio-controlled clocks become common place in USA

References

Sources
 
 
 
 
 

Historic
Historic inventions
Technology-related lists